Little River Nature Park is a protected area on the eastern shore of Vancouver Island in the Comox Valley Regional District. It is home to beaches, man-made ponds, an estuarine marsh, and well-drained forests dominated by Douglas-fir. The park is underlain by sand and gravel which was locally extracted in open pits; these have since become the ponds.

A 1959 soil map identifies, from north to south, the following complex units: Kye-Coastal Beach; Bowser-Custer; Parksville-Bowser. Kye loamy sand is a classic podzol with well-defined eluvial (A2 or Ae) horizon. This series supports the well-drained forests. Coastal Beach land type represents bare or grassy regosol sand. The imperfectly drained Bowser loamy sand is podzolic but usually does not have an A2 horizon. Similarly moist loamy sand podzolic soils with strong A2 development are assigned to the Custer series. The Parksville sandy loam represents poorly drained gleysolic soils.

A population of the rare Seaside rein-orchid was identified on the beach. An avifauna survey found 52 bird species.

References

Soil Survey of Southeast Vancouver Island and the Gulf Islands

Protected areas of British Columbia
Mid Vancouver Island
Nature centres in British Columbia
Year of establishment missing